Clinton High School was a public school in Clinton serving students in grades 7 through 12. It was created in 1886 and then from the consolidation in 1961 of former high schools in  southern Vermillion County, Indiana, Dana High School, Hillsdale High School, St. Bernice High School, and Blanford High School. Then in 1977 Clinton was replaced by a new building and renamed South Vermilion High School

Campus
The school was located in the center of Clinton just off Main St in the 300 Block of Blackman St. Their football field and baseball field was located at SportLand Park on the south west side of Clinton.

Consolidation

Athletics

Basketball
Clinton has an all-time record of (25) sectional Championships 1912, 1913, 1914, 1916, 1925, 1928, 1930, 1931, 1932, 1933, 1934, 1935, 1938, 1939, 1942, 1943, 1945, 1946, 1947, 1949, 1950, 1955, 1956, 1961, 1968.
The Clinton Wildcats made it to the IHSAA Sweet Sixteen (8) times in its history and the Elite Eight (2) times in its history

Clinton also has won (4) Regional Championships 1928, 1943, 1947, 1950.

Football
The Clinton Wildcat are mostly known for their football team that has won 5 Indiana Big School Football Champions in 1920, 1924, 1928, 1932, and 1933.

Head coaches

Team Records

Conference Championships
Clinton has won or shared a conference championship around nine occasions, including six Indiana High School Football Conference titles and three Western Indiana Conference titles.

State Championships
Clinton has won or shared a State championship on five occasions, including three outright Indiana High School Football titles and two shared titles. In 1933 Clinton tied East Chicago Washington 6–6 in the arranged post-season North-South Mythical State Championship Game and was named Winner of Indianapolis Times & IHSAA ‘Most Outstanding Team in Indiana’

Record vs Rivals

All-State Players
A total of 19 Wildcats have been recognized as All-State by various media selectors.

Notable alumni
 Emil Bildilli - Major League Baseball pitcher (1937-1941)
Chris Dal Dasso 1933 - All-State Tackle, Played at IU 1934–1936; team captain 1936, Athletic Director at Indiana University
 Lawrence J. Giacoletto 1934 - Known for his work in the field of semi-conductor circuit technology.
 Fred Vanzo 1934 - professional American football player who played running back for four seasons for the Detroit Lions and Chicago Cardinals.
 John Magnabosco 1923 - Head Coach Ball State 1935-1952 Head Coach Clinton Wildcats 1931-1934 3X State Champs 31,32,33. Indiana Football Hall Of Fame
 Tony Berto 1939 - Coached 39 years total - Otsego, Michigan, High School 1946–1948, Boonville HS 1948–1952, and Delphi HS 1952–1985; coached 3 sports for 24 years and 2 sports for 15 years (football, basketball, baseball, track, and golf); Delphi football record of 203 wins. Lettered at Purdue 1939–1943 in Football Basketball and Baseball. Indiana Football Hall Of Fame
Gerry Dick 1976 QB -  American journalist and former news anchor at WRTV, a television station in Indianapolis, Indiana.He is best known as the current host of Inside INdiana Business, a television program owned by Grow Indiana Media Ventures.

References

Educational institutions established in 1920
Public high schools in Indiana
Buildings and structures in Vermillion County, Indiana
1920 establishments in Indiana
Education in Vermillion County, Indiana